Vertel is an Australian telecommunications carrier specialising in the design, build and operation of premium next generation wireless networks for Corporations, Government, and Service Providers. Vertel's fixed wireless services branded as Etherwave CE VPN use a combination of microwave solutions and fibre optics to connect multiple points into a private scalable network.

Vertel is a member of the Metro Ethernet Forum (MEF) and was the first independent wireless carrier in the world to gain MEF certification for its Layer 2 Ethernet Service.

Vertel History
The company was formed in 1973 when a young Australian entrepreneur started a business called Communication Site Rentals. As the name suggested, this business initially provided high communication sites for government departments and large organisations who wanted to deploy two way radio (at the time a relatively new technology).

At this point in time Telecom Australia (now Telstra) was still a part of the Postmaster General's Department and would be for several more years.

As a pioneer of commercial radio networks, Vertel provided its first fully managed two way radio network some 24 years before the deregulation of the Australian telecommunications market (and 8 years before the first mobile phone call was placed in the country).

MEF Awards
In 2012 Vertel was awarded Best Carrier Ethernet Service in the APAC region

References

Wireless Internet service providers
Telecommunications companies of Australia